Piasa Township is one of eleven townships in Jersey County, Illinois, United States.  As of the 2010 census, its population was 3,376 and it contained 1,321 housing units.

Geography

Cities, towns, villages
 Brighton (western portion)

Unincorporated towns
 Lake Piasa

Adjacent townships
 Fidelity Township (north)
 Shipman Township, Macoupin County (northeast)
 Brighton Township, Macoupin County (east)
 Foster Township, Madison County (southeast)
 Godfrey Township, Madison County (south)
 Mississippi Township (west)
 Jersey Township (northwest)

Cemeteries
The township contains these five cemeteries: Botts, Edwards, Eldridge, Marston and Saint Alphonsus.

Major highways
  U.S. Route 67
  Illinois Route 267/111

Lakes
 Thunderbird Lake

Demographics

School districts
 Jersey Community Unit School District 100
 Southwestern Community Unit School District 9

Political districts
 Illinois' 19th congressional district
 State House District 97
 State Senate District 49

References
 
 United States Census Bureau 2007 TIGER/Line Shapefiles
 United States National Atlas

External links
 City-Data.com
 Illinois State Archives

Townships in Jersey County, Illinois
Townships in Illinois